Eva Holubová (born 7 March 1959) is a Czech actress. She is known for having cured herself of alcoholism. She received a Czech Lion Award in 2000 for her supporting role in the film Ene Bene and in 2006, she was nominated for the Best Actress Award at the Tribeca Film Festival for her role in Účastníci zájezdu.

Selected filmography

Film

Television

References

External links

 

1959 births
Living people
Czech film actresses
Czech television actresses
Actresses from Prague
Academy of Performing Arts in Prague alumni
Czech Lion Awards winners
Czech stage actresses